"Walking on Thin Ice" is a song by Yoko Ono, released in 1981. She and John Lennon concluded the recording of the song on December 8, 1980. It was upon their return from the recording studio to The Dakota (their home in New York City) that Lennon was murdered by Mark David Chapman. Lennon was clutching a tape of a final mix of the song before it was mastered when he was shot.

The song was both a critical and commercial success for Ono.

Background
Lennon's lead guitar work on the track, which he recorded on December 4, 1980, was his final creative act. It was rumored that he used his famous Beatles-era 1958 Rickenbacker 325 to record all the guitar parts. In fact, he actually used his new red Fender Stratocaster. At the end of January 1981, "Walking on Thin Ice" was released as a single and became Ono's first chart success, peaking at number 58 in the US and gaining major club/underground airplay. The single was released in February 1981 in the UK and reached number 35 on the chart. The critical reception was favorable: NME rated it in the best tracks of year 1981 at number 10. The lyrics talk of the unpredictability of life and death—of "throwing the dice in the air"—and reach the conclusion, "when our hearts return to ashes, it will be just a story....".  On the version included on 1992's Onobox, a new intro was added, where John Lennon can be heard remarking "I think you just cut your first number one, Yoko."

Ultimate Classic Rock critic Michael Gallucci rated it as Ono's best song, saying "it's a great New Wave song from the era and a testament to Ono's growing influence on other outre artists who followed." Record World said that "Yoko's existential lyrics are delivered over a driving rhythm – led by Tony Levin's spunky bass – that spews Lennon's molten guitar leads." 

The B-side, "It Happened", was a slower, mellow track about acceptance from Ono's vaults that was originally recorded for A Story and had already seen limited release in Japan as the B-side to "Yume O Moto", but was remixed for inclusion on the single. Much like the A-side, the lyrics have a retrospectively haunting quality given Lennon's murder: "It happened at a time of my life/When I least expected... And I know there's no return, no way". In the essay on the back of the single, Ono talks about how Lennon picked out this track from her old tapes and marked it as a hit. She said "No way!" to which he responded "I'll make it a hit". He was murdered hours later.

The song is also included on the experimental compilation album called Disco Not Disco (2000).  In 2003, riding on the success of several Ono club remixes including "Open Your Box" and "Kiss Kiss Kiss", "Walking on Thin Ice" was released as a maxi-single with remixes by dance artists including the Pet Shop Boys, Danny Tenaglia and Felix Da Housecat. It spent many weeks on the US dance chart before reaching number one, beating out Madonna and Justin Timberlake. In the UK, it reached number 35 on the chart, exactly the same position as the original reached in 1981.

Music videos
Yoko Ono herself directed a music video for "Walking on Thin Ice", released in February 1981, featuring footage of her in Times Square New York City and in Central Park, interspersed with archival video of her and John Lennon. In 2003 Mike Mills and Arya Senboutaraj (one half of the directing duo Rainbows & Vampires) directed an animated black and white video featuring the "Pet Shop Boys Electro Mix Edit" of the song.

Track listings

1981
Promo 7" single
A. "Walking on Thin Ice" (edit) – 3:23
B. "Walking on Thin Ice" (long version) – 5:58

7" / 12" single
A. "Walking on Thin Ice" – 5:59
B. "It Happened" (Remix) – 5:08

Promo 12" / Cassingle
A. "Walking on Thin Ice" – 5:59
B1. "It Happened" (Remix) – 5:08
B2. "Hard Times Are Over" – 3:26

2003

CD Maxi
 Pet Shop Boys Radio Mix – 4:09
 Danny Tenaglia Walked Across the Lake Mix – 12:40
 Pet Shop Boys Electro Mix – 6:37
 Felix da Housecat's Tribute Mix – 5:29
 Pet Shop Boys Extended Dance Mix – 7:58
 Rui da Silva's Kismet Mix – 10:42
 Peter Rauhofer Electro Mix – 6:08
 Orange Factory Radio Mix – 3:54
 FKEK Vocal Mix – 9:55
 Peter Rauhofer Chill Mix – 4:58

2×12" single
 Danny Tenaglia Walked Across the Lake Mix – 12:40
 Peter Rauhofer Future Mix – 10:07
 Pet Shop Boys Electro Mix – 6:37
 Pet Shop Boys Extended Dance Mix – 7:58
 Rui da Silva's Kismet Mix – 10:42
 FKEK Hard As Ice Dub – 8:35
 Orange Factory "Larry" Dub – 6:20
 Orange Factory Yoko-pella – 0:34

UK 12" single
 Danny Tenaglia Walked Across the Lake Mix – 12:40
 Pet Shop Boys Electro Mix – 6:37

US 12" single
 Danny Tenaglia Dub – 9:07
 Felix da Housecat's Tribute Mix – 5:29
 FKEK Vocal Mix – 9:55

UK CD1
 Pet Shop Boys Electro Mix Edit – 3:35
 Pet Shop Boys 7" Mix – 4:06
 Pet Shop Boys 12" Mix – 7:56

UK CD2
 Danny Tenaglia Walked Across the Lake Mix
 Felix Da Housecat's Tribute Mix Edit
 FKEK Vocal Mix Edit

UK CD promo
 Pet Shop Boys Electro Mix Edit
 Felix Da Housecat Tribute Mix Edit

iTunes single
 Pet Shop Boys Radio Mix – 4:09
 Danny Tenaglia Walked Across the Lake Mix – 12:40
 Pet Shop Boys Electro Mix – 6:37
 Felix da Housecat's Tribute Mix – 5:29
 Pet Shop Boys Extended Dance Mix – 7:58
 Rui da Silva's Kismet Mix – 10:42
 Peter Rauhofer Electro Mix – 6:08
 Orange Factory Radio Mix – 3:54
 FKEK Vocal Mix – 9:55
 Peter Rauhofer Chill Mix – 4:58
 Peter Rauhofer Future Mix – 10:07
 FKEK Hard as Ice Dub – 8:35
 Orange Factory "Larry" Dub – 6:20
 Orange Factory Yoko-pella – 0:34
 Danny Tenaglia Dub – 9:07

2007
 "Walking on Thin Ice" (with Jason Pierce of Spiritualized) – 5:07
 "Toyboat" (with Antony of Antony and the Johnsons and Hahn Rowe) – 4:24

2013

Pt. 1
 Emjae Vocal Mix – 5:04
 Emjae Dub – 5:31
 Dave Aude Radio Mix – 3:48
 Dave Aude House Mix – 6:35
 Dave Aude House Dub – 6:12
 Dave Aude House Instrumental – 6:35
 Ralphi Rosario Radio Edit – 3:50
 Ralphi Rosario Club Mix – 7:52
 Ralphi Rosario Dub – 7:23

Pt. 2
 Danny Tenaglia's Grand Ballroom Mix – 12:34
 Danny Tenaglia's Maestro Version – 2:47
 Danny Tenaglia's Give Ice a Chance Mix – 9:50
 R3hab Mix – 4:06
 R3hab Dub – 4:06
 R3hab Instrumental – 4:06

Pt. 3
 Superchumbo Mix – 8:13
 Superchumbo Dub – 8:11
 Tedd Patterson Club Mix – 6:58
 Tedd Patterson Dub Mix – 6:58
 Tedd Patterson Instrumental – 6:58
 Morel Hot Sauce Mix – 5:35
 Morel Hot Sauce Dub – 5:38
 Danny Tenaglia & Sebastian Dub – 7:45

Pt. 4
 Dave Aude Electro Disco Club Mix – 6:32
 Dave Aude Electro Disco Instrumental – 6:32
 Dave Aude Electro Disco Dub – 5:47
 Dave Aude Electro Disco Radio Edit – 4:16
 Peter Rauhofer Future Mix Twisted Edit – 5:41
 'Walking For Me' Sizequeen Mashup [feat. Sizequeen] – 5:51

Soundcloud exclusive
Dave Aude House Mixshow – 5:23

Awards and nominations
{| class=wikitable
|-
! Year !! Awards !! Work !! Category !! Result !! Ref.
|-
| 1982
| Grammy Awards
| "Walking on Thin Ice"
| Best Rock Vocal Performance, Female
| 
|
|-

Charts

Weekly charts

Year-end charts

Covers
Elvis Costello and The Attractions (ft. the TKO Horns) recorded a version on the album Every Man Has a Woman (1984). 
We've Got a Fuzzbox and We're Gonna Use It (aka Fuzzbox) released it as a single in 1989, peaking at #76 on the UK charts.
The Picketts also recorded a version, (1985) as did Tila Tequila on her EP Welcome to the Dark Side (2010).
Siouxsie Sioux performed it live with original guitarist Earl Slick and tabla player Talvin Singh, at Ono's Meltdown Festival in London in 2013.

See also
 List of number-one dance singles of 2003 (U.S.)
 List of number-one dance singles of 2013 (U.S.)
 List of post-disco artists and songs

References

1981 songs
1981 singles
2003 singles
2013 singles
Yoko Ono songs
New wave songs
Post-disco songs
Song recordings produced by Jack Douglas (record producer)
Song recordings produced by Yoko Ono
Song recordings produced by John Lennon
Geffen Records singles
Songs written by Yoko Ono